The 1989 Kentucky Derby was the 115th running of the Kentucky Derby. The race took place on May 6, 1989, with 122,653 people in attendance. The race took place on a track that was listed as muddy, but was drying out very well. The time on the -mile was the slowest time since Tim Tam rode to victory at the same length at also the same time of 2:05. Sunday Silence took the win with a 2 1/2 length victory over the favorite to win, Easy Goer.

Full results

Purse Winnings

Payout

 $2 Exacta: (10-2) Paid $15.20

Sunday Silence 
Sunday Silence was an unlikely winner as a youngster, but he grew into a true champion. He sported crooked hind legs and barely survived a virus as a weanling. Sunday Silence was not an attractive youngster and his owner, Arthur B. Hancock III, attempted to sell him at the 1987 Keeneland yearling sale. Hancock ended up buying the colt back for only $17,000. Sunday Silence completed his two-year-old season with only one victory from three starts and was described as looking like a "skinny teenager" from Hancock. Between two and three years old, the colt matured and began his three-year-old season as a front runner for the Kentucky Derby. Sunday Silence won both the San Felipe Stakes and the Santa Anita Derby and anticipation built for the confrontation between Sunday Silence and his competition for the Kentucky Derby, Easy Goer. Sunday Silence's win at the Derby was largely attributed to the muddy track, which Easy Goer was claimed to have not liked. Sunday Silence bested Easy Goer by a win of 2 1/2 lengths.

References

1989
Kentucky Derby
Derby
Kentucky
Kentucky Derby